Serranochromis altus, commonly known as the humpback largemouth, is an African species of fish in the family Cichlidae. It is found in the Okavango basin and the upper Zambezi basin, including the Kafue system.

References

altus
Fish described in 1991